Simon Wood is an Australian politician. He has been a Liberal member of the Tasmanian House of Assembly for Bass since 2022.

He served on Launceston City Council from 2014 to 2018, and at the time of his election was a staffer to Senator Wendy Askew. Wood was elected to the House of Assembly in a recount following the resignation of Peter Gutwein.

References

Year of birth missing (living people)
Living people
Members of the Tasmanian House of Assembly
Liberal Party of Australia members of the Parliament of Tasmania
21st-century Australian politicians